The first Iranian newspapers appeared in the mid-19th century during the reign of Naser al-Din Shah. More specifically, the first newspaper in Iran, Kaghaz-e Akhbar (The Newspaper), was launched for the government by Mirza Saleh Shirazi in 1837. By 1907 (the era of the Persian Constitutional Revolution), there were 90 newspapers circulating in Iran.

In 1952 under Mohammad Musaddiq's government there were 300 newspapers, including twenty-five dailies. During the 1979 revolution the number of newspapers was 100, of which twenty-three were dailies.

As of 2000 there were 23 Persian dailies, three English dailies and one Arabic daily in the country. In the period between 2000 and 2004 a total of 85 newspapers were closed down in Iran.

Iranian newspapers

Below is a list of newspapers published in Iran.

See also 
 International Rankings of Iran in Communication
 List of Iranian magazines
 Media of Iran

References 

This article incorporates information from the Persian Wikipedia.

Bibliography

External links 

 Largest online newspapers of Iran
 List of Iranian media on the Internet via Gooya
 List of Iranian Newspapers

Iran
 
Newspapers